Leonardo "Léo" César Jardim (born 20 March 1995) is a Brazilian professional footballer who plays as a goalkeeper for Vasco da Gama.

Club career
On 13 July 2019, Jardim joined Ligue 1 club Lille on a five-year contract. Jardim made his club debut on 2 October 2019 in Lille's 2–1 home defeat to Chelsea in the UEFA Champions League group stage. He made a further three appearances for Lille that season, all coming in the Coupe de la Ligue where the club was eliminated by Lyon on penalties in the semi-finals.

On 1 September 2020, Jardim joined Portuguese side Boavista on loan for the 2020–21 season.

Following Mike Maignan's exit to Milan in July 2021, Jardim was elevated to Lille's first choice goalkeeper. On 1 August 2021, Jardim kept a clean sheet for Lille in their 1–0 victory over Paris Saint-Germain in the Trophée des Champions. He made his Ligue 1 debut for the club in a 3–3 draw with Metz on 8 August.

Career statistics

Honours
Grêmio
Copa do Brasil: 2016

Lille
Trophée des Champions: 2021

References

External links
Léo Jardim profile. Portal Oficial do Grêmio.

1995 births
Living people
Brazilian footballers
Association football goalkeepers
Campeonato Brasileiro Série A players
Primeira Liga players
Ligue 1 players
Grêmio Foot-Ball Porto Alegrense players
CR Vasco da Gama players
Rio Ave F.C. players
Lille OSC players
Boavista F.C. players
Brazilian expatriate footballers
Brazilian expatriate sportspeople in Portugal
Expatriate footballers in Portugal
Brazilian expatriate sportspeople in France
Expatriate footballers in France
People from Ribeirão Preto
Footballers from São Paulo (state)